Nine Months is a 1995 American romantic comedy film produced, written and directed by Chris Columbus. The film stars Hugh Grant, Julianne Moore, Tom Arnold, Joan Cusack, Jeff Goldblum, and Robin Williams. It is a remake of the French film Neuf mois and served as Grant's first US starring role. It was filmed on location in the San Francisco Bay Area. The original music score was composed by Hans Zimmer. It was released on July 12, 1995, received mixed reviews from critics, and grossed $138 million worldwide.

Plot
Child psychologist Samuel Faulkner is in a long-term relationship with ballet teacher Rebecca Taylor. This all changes when Rebecca declares she is pregnant, and when questioned by Samuel about her birth control, she replies that birth control is only 97% effective.

Samuel's fears mount due to his encounters with overbearing couple Marty and Gail Dwyer and their three young unruly daughters, as well as the confusing advice he gets from Sean, his perpetually single artist friend and Gail's brother. Samuel is confused and unsure about what to do. Feeling that Samuel is not ready to be a father, Rebecca leaves him and moves in with Marty and Gail (who is also pregnant with a fourth child). Samuel tries to contact her, but she ignores him. Sean encourages him to move on, with Samuel trying new things like rollerblading, getting an earring, and going to parties, but the thought of Rebecca still weighs heavy on his mind.

When a woman makes a move on Samuel at a party, he declines, saying that he is not ready to move on yet. He later views an ultrasound of his soon-to-be-born son and decides that it is time to take responsibility before it is too late. He sells his Porsche, buys a family car, and gets back together with Rebecca, much to Gail's delight.

Samuel and Rebecca then get married and not long afterward, they go out to dinner. During an awkward moment where they bump into the woman he met earlier at the party, Rebecca goes into labor. They rush to the hospital, where they meet Marty and Gail; who has gone into labor as well. Rebecca gives birth to their baby boy named Samuel Jr. and Gail gives birth to their fourth daughter named Becky.

Cast

Production 
Nine Months was filmed in the San Francisco area, including Marin County, Napa Valley, and Oakland, beginning in October 1994.

Music
 "The Time of Your Life"
 Written by Steve Van Zandt
 Performed by Little Steven
 "These Are the Days"
 Written and Performed by Van Morrison
 "Let's Get It On"
 Written by Marvin Gaye and Ed Townsend
 Performed by Marvin Gaye
 "Baby, I Love You"
 Written by Phil Spector, Ellie Greenwich and Jeff Barry
 Performed by The Ronettes
 "Turn Back the Hands of Time"
 Written by Bonnie F. Thompson and Jack Daniels
 Performed by Tyrone Davis
 "19th Nervous Breakdown"
 Written by Mick Jagger and Keith Richards
 Performed by The Rolling Stones

Reception

Box office
The movie debuted at #3 at the box office behind Apollo 13 and Under Siege 2: Dark Territory with $12.5 million in its opening weekend. Nine Months went on to gross $138.5 million worldwide.

Critical response
On Rotten Tomatoes the film holds an approval rating of 25% based on 32 reviews, with an average rating of 4.7/10. The site's critics consensus states: "Nine Months finds writer-director Chris Columbus playing to his worst comedic instincts -- and relying far too heavily on the trademark tics of his miscast leading man." On Metacritic the film has a weighted average score of 47 out of 100, based on 23 critics, indicating "mixed or average reviews". Audiences surveyed by CinemaScore gave the film an average grade "A−" on scale of A+ to F.

Roger Ebert gave the film two stars, saying, "Nine Months is one of those movies where the outcome is abundantly clear to everyone but the hero, who remains in the hapless position of playing dumb because, if he didn't, there wouldn't be a plot."
Todd McCarthy of Variety called it "An exceedingly safe and conventional Chris Columbus comedy."

Hugh Grant's opinion
Grant has spoken disparagingly of his performance in Nine Months, stating in an interview with the SAG-AFTRA Foundation that: "I really ruined it. And it was entirely my fault. I panicked, it was such a big jump up from what I'd been paid before to what they were offering me. And the scale was inhuman to my standards, you know the scale of the production, 20th Century Fox, the whole thing. And I just tried much too hard, and you know I forgot to do basic acting things, like mean it. So I pulled faces and overacted, it was a shocker."

On another occasion, he referred to director Chris Columbus as a "genius" and his "brilliant" co-stars, but further commented: "You know, having been paid £20,000 or whatever it was, to do Four Weddings and a Funeral, if you're suddenly paid millions, you think well I better ramp up my performance by 200 times. But all that means is that you overact grotesquely, which is what I did. So I'm always very apologetic to those people."

Grant says his disappointment at his performance in Nine Months, following a preview of the film, led him to "a Ken Russell kind of lunch" and later, engaging in a sex act with Divine Brown in Los Angeles in 1995.

References

External links
 
 
 
 
 

1492 Pictures films
1995 romantic comedy films
1995 films
20th Century Fox films
American pregnancy films
American remakes of French films
American romantic comedy films
1990s English-language films
Films directed by Chris Columbus
Films produced by Chris Columbus
Films produced by Michael Barnathan
Films scored by Hans Zimmer
Films set in San Francisco
Films shot in San Francisco
Films with screenplays by Chris Columbus
1990s pregnancy films
1990s American films